Cämmerer See is a lake in Usedom, Mecklenburg-Vorpommern, Germany.

References

Lakes of Mecklenburg-Western Pomerania